Muhammed Kerem Aktürkoğlu (born 21 October 1998) is a Turkish professional footballer who plays as a winger for Turkish Süper Lig club Galatasaray and the  Turkey national team.

Club career
Aktürkoğlu began his career with Başakşehir's youth academy, and was loaned to Bodrumspor. He then spent various seasons in the amateur TFF First League, before breaking out with Erzincanspor in the 2019–20 season scoring 20 goals in 34 games.

Galatasaray
Aktürkoğlu transferred to Galatasaray on 2 September 2020. He made his professional debut with Galatasaray in a 1–1 Süper Lig tie with Kayserispor on 23 November 2020.

On 16 August 2021, Aktürkoğlu was involved in a physical altercation with teammate Marcão during a game against Giresunspor.

International career
Aktürkoğlu made his debut for Turkey national team on 27 May 2021 in a friendly against Azerbaijan.

Career statistics

Club

International

Scores and results list Turkey's goal tally first, score column indicates score after each Aktürkoğlu goal.

Honours
Individual
Süper Lig Left Winger of the Year: 2021–22

References

External links
 
 
 

1998 births
Living people
Sportspeople from İzmit
Turkish footballers
Association football wingers
Turkey international footballers
Turkey youth international footballers
UEFA Euro 2020 players
Süper Lig players
İstanbul Başakşehir F.K. players
Karacabey Belediyespor footballers
24 Erzincanspor footballers
Galatasaray S.K. footballers